Robert Grant (25 September 1940 – February 2017) was a Scottish footballer who played as an inside forward.

Career
Grant began his career at Ormiston Primrose, before signing for Rangers in 1959. On 27 April 1960, Grant made his only appearance for Rangers, in a 4–1 defeat to away to Clyde. In 1961, Grant signed for St Johnstone, making three Scottish Football League appearances during his time at the club. In 1962, Grant moved to England, signing for Carlisle United. Grant made two English Football League appearances for the club, scoring once. After a spell at Carlisle, Grant dropped into non-league, playing for Chelmsford City and Cheltenham Town. In 1965, Grant signed for Gloucester City, taking up a player-manager role. Grant made 100 appearances in all competitions, scoring 36 times. Following the culmination of his spell at Gloucester, Grant moved back up to Scotland, playing for Queen of the South and Newtongrange Star.

Personal life
Grant's son, Roddy, was also a footballer for St Johnstone.

References

1940 births
2017 deaths
Association football forwards
Scottish footballers
Footballers from Edinburgh
Ormiston Primrose F.C. players
Rangers F.C. players
Leyton Orient F.C. players
Stirling Albion F.C. players
St Johnstone F.C. players
Carlisle United F.C. players
Chelmsford City F.C. players
Cheltenham Town F.C. players
Gloucester City A.F.C. players
Queen of the South F.C. players
Newtongrange Star F.C. players
English Football League players
Scottish Football League players
Gloucester City A.F.C. managers
Scottish football managers